Martin Shaw (born 21 January 1945) is an English actor. He came to national recognition as Doyle in ITV crime-action television drama series The Professionals (1977–1983). Further notable television parts include the title roles in The Chief (1993–1995), Judge John Deed (2001–2007) and Inspector George Gently (2007–2017). He has also acted on stage and in film, and has narrated numerous audiobooks and presented various television series.

Early life
Shaw was born in Birmingham. His childhood was spent in Alleyne Grove in Erdington and Sutton Coldfield. Shaw attended Great Barr School, where he excelled in English literature and drama lessons.  At sixteen, he was offered a scholarship to a Birmingham drama school but declined. 

In his youth, Shaw was involved in a drunken brawl with a friend, suffering broken teeth, injuries to his face and a fractured skull, and needed cheekbone surgery.  

At age eighteen, Shaw moved to London to attend the London Academy of Music and Dramatic Art.  He served his apprenticeship in repertory as an assistant stage manager at the Queen's Theatre, Hornchurch and the Bristol Old Vic.

Stage
Shaw took key roles in the first revival of Look Back in Anger (Royal Court/Criterion, 1968); in the National Theatre's Saturday, Sunday, Monday opposite Laurence Olivier (1973); and in A Streetcar Named Desire presented by the Piccadilly Theatre in 1974. He later acknowledged the role of Stanley Kowalski in 'Streetcar' as a point of breakthrough in his career.

In 1985, Shaw played Elvis Presley in Alan Bleasdale's critically acclaimed Are You Lonesome Tonight?. It told the story of Presley's last few hours. After a long run in London, the production visited Sydney, Melbourne and Adelaide in Australia.  

Shaw's portrayal of Lord Goring in An Ideal Husband on Broadway earned him a Tony Award nomination and a Drama Desk award. 

After filming finished on the TV series Judge John Deed, Shaw took the role of Thomas More in Robert Bolt's play A Man for All Seasons. Shaw's daughter, Sophie, played opposite him as More's daughter, Margaret. The production toured Britain's cities before a run in London at the Theatre Royal Haymarket.

In 2013. in a new production of the classic play Twelve Angry Men at the Garrick Theatre London, Shaw played the part of the dissenting juror (identified as juror number 8).

In 2016 Shaw toured and hit the West End again with a lively production of Hobson's Choice at the Vaudeville. After completing filming the final episode of George Gently, Shaw again toured in 2017 with the U.K. premier of Gore Vidal's 1960 political piece: The Best Man. Shaw played the part of William Russell, former US Secretary of State.

Television
Shaw began television work in 1967. Parts in one-off plays for Granada Television led to his playing hippy student Robert Croft, Lucile Hewitt's boyfriend, in Coronation Street. Another early role was booze and football-loving Welsh medical student Huw Evans in the television comedy series Doctor in the House. He later guest-starred, playing the same role, in the follow-up series Doctor at Large, now a nervous expectant father in the episode "Mother and Father Doing Well". 

Shaw appeared with future co-star Lewis Collins in an episode of The New Avengers. Both played the roles of terrorists. Shaw portrayed Ray Doyle ("Agent 4–5") in the British television series The Professionals (1977–1983), opposite Collins. Shaw played another law-enforcement role in the 1990s ITV production The Chief.

In 1983, Shaw played Robert Falcon Scott in The Last Place on Earth. The series was filmed at Frobisher Bay near the city of Iqaluit on Baffin Island, Canada. In interview at the time, Shaw commented that he generally responded well to the testing physical conditions, particularly when they enhanced the reality of the scene. In the same year he played Sir Henry Baskerville in The Hound of the Baskervilles, an adaptation of the novel by Sir Arthur Conan Doyle. He acted opposite Ian Richardson's Sherlock Holmes and Donald Churchill's Dr. Watson.

He played Cecil Rhodes in Rhodes, an eight-part serial that aired in 1996 and was filmed on location in South Africa. Shaw's younger son, Joe, took early leave of his drama school course to play the part of the youthful Rhodes.  

Another television acting credit includes the role of Dr Robert Kingston in Always and Everyone (1999–2002), a British accident and emergency medical series, played alongside Niamh Cusack.  

In 2001, he took the title role in the BBC drama Judge John Deed. The character gave an editorial voice to the television writer and producer G.F. Newman's ideas about lifestyle choices such as vegetarianism and alternative medicine as well as issues of social justice. One episode about the safety of the MMR vaccine was banned.

Between seasons of Judge John Deed, Shaw took the role of poetic bespectacled forensic detective Adam Dalgliesh in P.D. James's Death in Holy Orders in 2003 and The Murder Room in 2005. After the sixth season of Judge John Deed had been filmed, Shaw appeared in the series Apparitions, broadcast by the BBC in 2008. This was Shaw's first project as executive director.

From 2007 until 2017 he played the title role in the BBC TV series Inspector George Gently alongside co-star Lee Ingleby.
On 9 May 2015 Shaw recited "For the Fallen" at VE Day 70: A Party to Remember in Horse Guards Parade, London which was broadcast on BBC 1.

In 2021 he played the role of Dennis Stephenson, leader of a fictitious religious cult called the Barum Brethren, in the BritBox original series The Long Call. The series premiered in autumn 2021, and is based on the Ann Cleeves bestselling novel.

Film
Although Shaw is not classified as a film actor he has had several roles over the years. His first film role was an Irish communist in a 1967 television adaptation of the novel, Love on the Dole. Better known is his 1971 role of Banquo in Roman Polanski's Macbeth. He has also been seen as an undercover Second World War operative in the 1975 production Operation Daybreak; a singing and dancing futuristic magician "Zax" in Facelift; the role of Rachid in the 1973 film The Golden Voyage of Sinbad, and a wanted villain leading a life on the run in a circus troupe in Ladder of Swords (1989).

Narration and documentaries
Shaw has narrated many audiobooks, including Tolkien's The Hobbit and The Silmarillion; Swift's Gulliver's Travels; and Emily Brontë's Wuthering Heights. In 2006, Shaw narrated and appeared in a DVD chronicling the "Merlins over Malta" project. This featured the return of a Second World War Supermarine Spitfire and Hawker Hurricane from Britain to Malta for the first time in fifty years.

In December 2006, Shaw presented the six-part Discovery Channel Real Time TV series Martin Shaw: Aviators, produced by Twofour, which followed the two-year restoration of his Boeing Stearman biplane after it was crashed by another pilot at Old Buckenham airfield in Norfolk. Shaw fulfilled a lifetime ambition to take the controls of a Spitfire (owned by Maurice Bayliss) and, though take-off was not permitted, he also powered an English Electric Lightning (owned by Russell Carpenter) to 150 mph in three seconds along the runway at Cranfield Airport. Shaw also compared notes with the nonagenarian builder and developer of the modern autogyro, Wing Cdr. Ken Wallis.

In 2010 he presented a documentary for the BBC titled Dambusters Declassified in which he investigated and debunked some of the myths of the dambusters raid known as Operation Chastise story which had been portrayed in the books Enemy Coast Ahead and The Dambusters, and the film The Dam Busters.

Advertisements
Among several voiceovers and appearances, in 1974, Shaw starred in a three-minute advertisement for the Mk II Ford Capri and in 1987, a TV advert for the Vauxhall Cavalier.

Activism and charity work
Shaw is a celebrity activist for animal rights and animal welfare. He is the patron of the Hillside Animal Sanctuary in Frettenham in Norfolk, a charity organisation which provides a safe home for neglected and abused animals. He also supports Viva! and Dr Hadwen Trust.

In March 2012, he also announced that he would become the official patron to the community organisation Stop Norwich UrBanisation or SNUB, whose aim is to protect Norfolk's countryside from overdevelopment and excessive urbanisation. In the press release, he stated that he was "simply furious and upset by your plight and that of all of us who wish to live in quiet and peace. I will be your Patron and keep fighting".

Personal life
In 1971, Shaw became a follower of Charan Singh, of the Sant Mat religion. 

Shaw lives in Hingham in Norfolk.

On 18 August 2010, Shaw collapsed during the first act of the matinee showing of A Country Girl at Shrewsbury's Theatre Severn. His agent, Roger Charteris, said he had been suffering from cracked ribs and was taking antibiotics for a severe chest infection. An understudy went on in his place.

Shaw has been teetotal and a vegetarian for over 40 years.

Awards and nominations
Shaw won two awards in 1996 for his performance as Lord Goring in the Broadway production of An Ideal Husband and was nominated for a third:
 Winner of the Drama Desk Award for Outstanding Featured Actor in a Play
 Winner of the Theatre World Special Award for Ensemble Performance
 Nominated for the Tony Award for Best Actor in a Play

Appearances

Television

 Coronation Street as Robert Croft
 On the Move (1975–1976) as Martin
 Helen: A Woman of Today (1973) as Frank Tully
 The Duchess of Duke Street "Family Matters" (1976) as Arthur
 The Professionals (1977–1983) as Ray Doyle
 Doctor in the House (1969) as Huw Evans 
 Doctor at Large (1971) as Huw Evans (11 episodes)
 Beasts (1976) as Dave (episode "Buddyboy")
 Cream in My Coffee (by Dennis Potter) (1980) as Jack Butcher
 East Lynne (1982) as Archibald Carlyle
 The Hound of the Baskervilles (1983) as Sir Henry Baskerville
 The Last Place on Earth (1985) as Robert Falcon Scott
 The Chief (1993–1995) as Chief Constable Alan Cade
 Rhodes (1996) as Cecil Rhodes
 The Scarlet Pimpernel (1999-2000) as Chauvelin
 A&E (1999–2002) as Robert Kingsford
 Death in Holy Orders (2003) as Adam Dalgliesh
 The Murder Room (2004) as Adam Dalgliesh.
 Judge John Deed (2001–2007) as Judge John Deed
 Martin Shaw: Aviators (2006)
 Cranford (2007) as Peter Jenkyns
 Inspector George Gently (2007–2017) as George Gently
 Lemur Street (2007)
 Apparitions (2008) as Father Jacob
 Agatha Christie's Poirot Three Act Tragedy (2010) as Charles Cartwright
 Dambusters Declassified (2010) as presenter
 Playhouse Presents (2012) as Piers Hunt
 Strike (2017) as Tony Landry
 The Long Call (2021) as Dennis Stephenson

Theatre

 Look Back in Anger (Royal Court transferring to the Criterion Theatre, 1968) as "Cliff Lewis".
 The Contractor (Royal Court, 1969; transferring to the Fortune Theatre, 1970) as "Paul".
 The Battle of Shrivings (Lyric Theatre, 1970) as "David".
 Cancer (in the United States, Moon Children; Royal Court, 1970) as "Bob".
 The Bacchae (National Theatre at the Old Vic, 1973) as "Dionysus".
 Saturday, Sunday, Monday (National Theatre at the Old Vic, 1973) as "Attilio" opposite Laurence Olivier.
 A Streetcar Named Desire (Piccadilly Theatre, 1974) as "Stanley Kowalski".
 Miss Julie (Greenwich Theatre, 1975) as "Jean".
 Teeth 'n' Smiles (Wyndham's Theatre, 1976) as "Arthur".
 They're Playing Our Song (Shaftesbury Theatre, 1981) as "Vernon Gersch".
 The Country Girl (Apollo Theatre, 1983).
 Are You Lonesome Tonight? (Phoenix Theatre, 1985) as 'The Older Elvis Presley' (also Sydney, New South Wales, Australia)
 The Big Knife (Albery Theatre, 1987) as Charles Castle
 Other People's Money (Lyric Theatre, 1990) as "Garfinkel".
 Betrayal (Almeida Theatre, 1991) as "Robert".
 Sienna Red, by Stephen Poliakoff and co-starring Francesca Annis (Richmond Theatre, May 1992).
 An Ideal Husband (Globe Theatre, 1992) as "Lord Goring".
 Rough Justice by Terence Frisby (Apollo Theatre, 1994) as "James Highwood".
 An Ideal Husband (Haymarket Theatre transferring to the Old Vic, 1996; revived at the Haymarket in 1997 then transferred to the Gielgud Theatre).
 Vertigo (Theatre Royal Windsor, October 1998) as "Roger Flaviares" alongside his subsequent co-star Jenny Seagrove in Judge John Deed.
 A Man For All Seasons (Haymarket, 2005/6) as Sir Thomas More.
 The Country Girl (Apollo Theatre, October 2010) co-starring Jenny Seagrove, following a tour.
 Hobson's Choice, (Vaudeville Theatre, 2016) as Henry Hobson.

Film
 Macbeth (1971) as Banquo.
 The Golden Voyage of Sinbad (1973) as Rachid.
 Operation Daybreak (1975) as Sergeant Karel Čurda.
 Facelift (1984) as Zax.
 Intrigue (1988) As Roskov
 Ladder of Swords (1989).
 Oilman (short film).
 6 Days as Dellow
 Off the Rails'' as Federico

Notes

References

External links

 
 

1945 births
People from Erdington
20th-century English male actors
21st-century English male actors
Male actors from Birmingham, West Midlands
Alumni of the London Academy of Music and Dramatic Art
Drama Desk Award winners
English aviators
English male film actors
English male soap opera actors
English male stage actors
English male voice actors
Living people
People from Hingham, Norfolk